Danmarks Nationalbank issued a 100 kroner bank note on 22 November 1999 – updated it on 27 November 2002 – out of print as of 4 May 2010.

The Danish 100-kroner bill (DKK100) is a denomination of Danish currency.  Danish composer Carl Nielsen is featured on the front side of the bill and a basilisk from Tømmerby Church is featured on the reverse.  This version began circulation on 27 November 2002.

The face of the banknote has a portrait of the composer Carl Nielsen (9 June 1865 to 3 October 1931). Carl Nielsen was an orchestra leader, conductor, and music teacher, but above all a very versatile composer.  He is known for writing operas such as Maskarade (1905–1906), and many symphonic works.

The reverse of the 100-kroner banknote shows a basilisk from Tømmerby Church in Vester Hanherred in northern Denmark. (A basilisk is part snake, part dragon, and part rooster. Basilisk means "little king" and the figure is recognisable by its crown.) Around half of all Danish banknotes in circulation are 100-kroner banknotes, making it the principal banknote in the series.

The 100-kroner bill is sometimes referred to as a hund (Danish for 'dog'), from a shortening of the word hundrede (a hundred).

27 November 2002 the Danish national bank improved the security features with a hologram with two musical notes, the Roman numeral "C." and the number "100." When the note is tilted the "C" grows larger and a rainbow appears. Using a magnifying glass, it is possible to see a microprinted "100" in the outer line around the letter "C."

References 

 

Banknotes of Denmark
Portraits on banknotes